Four ships of the Royal Navy have been named HMS Irresistible. A fifth was planned but later renamed:
  was a 74-gun third-rate ship of the line launched in 1782 and broken up in 1806.
She was captured by the French in 1801, and recaptured in the Battle of Trafalgar in 1805. She was renamed HMS Irresistible in 1806 and was broken up in 1816.
  was an 80-gun screw propelled second rate launched in 1859. She was used for harbour service from 1869 and was sold in 1894. 
  was a  launched in 1898 and sunk by a mine in 1915 in Gallipoli, Turkey.
She was renamed  before being launched in 1950.

Royal Navy ship names